The CID building attack was a gun, grenade and truck bomb attack in Karachi, Sindh, Pakistan on 11 November 2010. Initial reports indicated the building housing Pakistan's Criminal Investigation Department (CID) had been badly damaged and a blast crater of 5 metres was discovered in close proximity. At least 18 people were killed and 100 injured, though casualty figures were expected to rise. The Tehrik-i-Taliban Pakistan claimed responsibility for the attack through Azam Tariq, their spokesman. However, the involvement of Lashkar-e-Jhangvi was also contested with interior minister Rehman Malik appearing sure of the possibility.

Attack 
The attack was coordinated on the headquarters of (CID), which is responsible for anti-terrorism operations, in what is described as the city's "highest security zone" –  metres away from the house of the provincial Chief Minister of Sindh and two five-star hotels. According to Tariq, the attack was carried out in retaliation for the continued drone attacks in northwest Pakistan. Authorities reported that five to six people were seen throwing grenades and firing at the gate of the building, consequently killing the guards posted there; moments later, a vehicle packed with explosives made its way inside and exploded just metres away from the building, causing damage and destruction to nearby structures as well. Additionally, other witnesses reported that prior to the blast, a gunfight had taken place between heavily armed militants and security forces; a local resident remarked that this firing continued for 20 minutes before the explosion had occurred.

See also
 List of terrorist incidents, 2010

References

2010 in Sindh
CID building attack
2010s crimes in Karachi
2010 mass shootings in Asia
Attacks on buildings and structures in 2010
Attacks on buildings and structures in Karachi
Attacks on police stations in the 2010s
CID attack
Grenade attacks
Mass murder in 2010
Mass murder in Karachi
CID building attack
November 2010 crimes
November 2010 events in Pakistan
Suicide bombings in 2010
Suicide bombings in Karachi
CID building attack
CID building attack